Crotch may refer to:

 Crotch, the region of an object where it splits into two or more limbs
 Crotch Blowout, a tear in denim jeans in the crotch area.
 the corner formed by the rails on a carom billiards table
 George Robert Crotch (1842-1874), British entomologist
 William Crotch (1775-1847), English composer, organist and artist
 Crotch Hill, a summit in Maine, United States

See also
 Crotched (disambiguation)